"The Night That All Time Broke Out" is a short story by Brian W. Aldiss from Harlan Ellison's Dangerous Visions. The story presents a future world where time itself can be concentrated into a substance which is inhaled and used as a drug, causing the user to temporarily regress to an earlier time period. There is an explosion at the factory which produces the gas, causing a widespread regression of civilization (though it is unclear as to the extent).

External links 

1967 short stories
Short fiction about time travel
Dangerous Visions short stories
Works by Brian Aldiss